or  (Arabic: نوال nawāl) is Arabic female given name literally meaning "unmerited favour of God" or "gift, grant, present, donation, award, offering" or also could mean "state or quality of being kind, act of kindness beyond what is due" or "grace, kindness, favour, charity". The name is actually an infinitive form of the adjective which stems from verb  , meaning "to accomplish, achieve, earn, gain, receive". 

Generally, the name is used for girls but actually is gender-neutral. 

In Hindustani,  means 'new'. This name is used in many countries such as Pakistan, India, Saudi Arabia and other Muslim countries throughout the world.

People with the name include

Nawal (musician), Comorian musician
Nawal Kishore Dhawal, Indian writer
Nawal El Jack, Sudanese sprinter
Nawal al-Hawsawi, Saudi Arabian pilot and activist
Nawal El Kuwaitia, Kuwaiti singer
Nawal Mansouri, Algerian volleyball player
Nawal El Moutawakel, Moroccan hurdler
Nawal M. Nour, Sudanese-American obstetrician and gynecologist
Nawal El Saadawi, Egyptian feminist
Nawal Kishore Sharma, Indian politician
Nawal El Tatawy (born 1942), Egyptian economist
Nawal Al Zoghbi, Lebanese singer

Arabic feminine given names